The Bars class were a group of submarines built for the Imperial Russian Navy during World War I. A total of 24 boats were built between 1914 and 1917. A number of them saw action during the First World War, and three were lost  in the conflict. The surviving boats were taken over by the Soviets after the Bolshevik Revolution and a number of them remained in service until the 1930s.

Design
The Bars-class submarines were ordered by the Imperial Russian Navy under their 1912 construction programme. 24 boats were ordered; 12 for the Baltic Fleet, six for the Black Sea, and six for the Siberian flotilla. The Baltic Fleet units were built at the Baltic Yard, St. Petersburg, and the Noblessner Yard, Reval (now Tallinn). The Black Sea units were built at Nikolayev, at the Baltic and the Naval Yards. The Siberian units were also built in the Baltic, but the outbreak of the First World War made their transfer impossible, and they were reassigned to the Baltic Fleet in 1915.

These boats were designed by Ivan Bubnov and based on the preceding . They were single-hulled, but like the Morzh boats lacked internal bulkheads. The Morzh design was enlarged with more powerful engines, a larger torpedo armament, and larger guns.

As designed the boats were to have two  electric and two  diesel engines, but a shortage of these diesels meant the boats had a variety of machinery fitted. Only Kuguar and Zmeya had the diesels originally intended for them. This and greater than expected hull resistance left them with lower than intended underwater speeds.

The gun armament too was problematic; the intended armament was one  and one  gun, but this too, varied according to availability. Three units (Bars, Vepr, and Volk) carried two 63 mm guns, while four others had an additional 75 mm gun. The Black Sea boats had one 75 mm and one 37 mm gun. 

The torpedo armament comprised four internal  torpedo tubes and eight external torpedoes in drop collars mounted in recessed niches low in the hull. Trials with Bars and Vepr showed these to be unsuitable and subsequent vessels had the niches and drop-collars moved to the upper deck; Bars and Vepr were later refitted to this pattern, before their ultimate complete removal.

The design had numerous shortcomings, including a lack of internal bulkheads and a slow diving time. Surviving boats were modernized after the Russian Civil War by installing bulkheads, new diesels, pumps and extra torpedo tubes (the external drop collars were removed).

Service history
The Baltic Fleet units saw action during the First World War and made numerous war patrols in the Baltic, despite being limited by the short operating season. In the 1915 ice-free season they targeted German warships but with little success, these being generally fast and well-protected. In the 1916 and 1917 seasons they were employed attacking German iron-ore shipments along the Swedish coast, though again with little success, due to the restrictions imposed by Swedish neutrality.

Three vessels (Lvitsa and Gepard) were lost in action. Two (Edinorog and Ugor) were lost in marine accidents and two (Forel and Yaz)were left unfinished. Another two (Kuguar and Vepr) were designated as training units. With the onset of the Bolshevik Revolution and the start of the Russian Civil War the surviving units in the Baltic were taken over by the Soviets and saw some action against Allied Intervention forces; in 1919 Pantera sank the British destroyer .

The Black Sea units were unfinished during World War I and were seized by the German occupation forces before being surrendered to the Allies and the White Russian forces of General Wrangel. With the end of the Civil War the surviving Bars-class vessels remained in service until the 1930s before being discarded.

Ships

Notes

References
 Conway's All the World's Fighting Ships 1906-1921
 V.Dygalo, The Fleet of the State of Russia. The Roots and Origin of the Russian Navy (extract)
 History of Bars class 
Rare submarine found at the bottom of Gulf of Finland: 28 May 2009, Postimees (in Estonian)

External links

 Bars class submarines at morflot.tsi.ru
 Bars class submarines at deepstorm.ru
 Bars class submarines VY Gribovsky (Russian)

Submarine classes
Submarines of the Imperial Russian Navy
 
Wrangel's fleet
Russian and Soviet navy submarine classes